George Land was a professional rugby league footballer who played in the 1920s.

Playing career
Land made his début for Wakefield Trinity during September 1920.

References

External links

Search for "Land" at rugbyleagueproject.org

Year of birth missing
Year of death missing
Place of birth missing
Place of death missing
Rugby league centres
Wakefield Trinity players
English rugby league players